The Schmidt-Godert Farm (also known as the Jacob Godert Farm) is a historic site in Panama City, Florida. It is located at 100 SR 2297. On October 4, 2002, it was added to the U.S. National Register of Historic Places.

On October 10, 2018, the barn was destroyed by hurricane Michael. Roughly 6 months after, the blacksmith building was removed due to damage from the hurricane.
The cane mill on the property is currently structurally unsound and is in a state of active decay.

References

External links
 Bay County listings at National Register of Historic Places

Buildings and structures in Panama City, Florida
National Register of Historic Places in Bay County, Florida
Houses in Bay County, Florida